Moronata is a genus of moths belonging to the family Tortricidae.

Species
Moronata eriosocii Razowski & Pelz, 2003

See also
List of Tortricidae genera

References

 , 2005: World catalogue of insects volume 5 Tortricidae.
  2003: Tortricidae collected in Ecuador in the years 1996–1999: Euliini (Lepidoptera). Nachrichten des Entomologischen Vereins Apollo (N.F.) 24 (4): 189–207.

External links
tortricidae.com

Euliini
Tortricidae genera